John Patrick Sullivan (born October 1, 1956) is a former American football linebacker who played for the New York Jets in the National Football League (NFL). He played college football at University of Illinois.

References 

1956 births
Living people
American football linebackers
Illinois Fighting Illini football players
New York Jets players